César Salvatore Devarez Santana (born September 22, 1969) is a former Major League Baseball catcher who played with the Baltimore Orioles in  and .

External links

1969 births
Living people
Baltimore Orioles players
Bluefield Orioles players
Bowie Baysox players
Bridgeport Bluefish players
Cafeteros de Córdoba players
Dominican Republic expatriate baseball players in Mexico
Dominican Republic expatriate baseball players in the United States
Durham Bulls players
Frederick Keys players
Gulf Coast Devil Rays players
Hagerstown Suns players

Major League Baseball catchers
Major League Baseball players from the Dominican Republic
Mexican League baseball catchers
Orlando Rays players
People from San Francisco de Macorís
Rochester Red Wings players
Tigres del México players
Wausau Timbers players